Arthur Kelton (d. 1549/1550) was an author who wrote in rhyme about Welsh history.

Biography
He dealt with early British history after the uncritical fashion of Geoffrey of Monmouth, and made no serious effort at scholarship.

Recognition
As Philip Schwyzer says in the Dictionary of National Biography, "His works are devoted to the celebration, in roughly equal measure, of British antiquity, the Tudor dynasty, the Reformation, and the union of England and Wales. Kelton's originality lies in the way he fused these disparate strands into a grand historical narrative." This was later to be a common theme in English literature.

References
Philip Schwyzer, 'Kelton, Arthur (d. 1549/50)’, Oxford Dictionary of National Biography, Oxford University Press, 2004 retrieved 16 April 2007 (subscription access)
W. O. Ringler, 'Arthur Kelton's contributions to early British history', Huntington Library Quarterly, 40 (1976–7), 353–6.

16th-century Welsh historians
Anglo-Welsh poets
1550s deaths